Ganlu is a town in Gongqingcheng, in northern Jiangxi province, China. , it has one residential community, 6 villages and 2 forest areas under its administration.

References

Township-level divisions of Jiangxi
Gongqingcheng